Seticosta egregia is a species of moth of the family Tortricidae. It is found in Ecuador in the provinces of Morona-Santiago and Zamora-Chinchipe.

The wingspan is 17 mm. The forewings are brownish, strigulated (finely streaked) with brown. In the terminal part, the forewings are brownish, tinged with cream and strigulated with brown. The hindwings are whitish grey at the base, brownish grey towards the periphery and strigulated with brownish grey.

Etymology
The species name refers to the overall appearance of the species and is derived from Latin egregius (meaning remarkable).

References

Moths described in 2004
Seticosta